Universiti Teknikal Malaysia Melaka (Jawi: اونيۏرسيتي تيكنيكل مليسيا ملاك , literally meaning Technical University of Malaysia, Malacca, abbreviated as UTeM) is a public university located in Durian Tunggal, Malacca, Malaysia. It is the first technical public university and the 14th public university overall in Malaysia. The university is considered the pioneer in the use of the "Practice and Application Oriented" teaching and learning method for tertiary level technical education in Malaysia.

UTeM was established on 1 December 2000 as Kolej Universiti Teknikal Kebangsaan Malaysia (National Technical University College of Malaysia, abbreviated as KUTKM), under Section 20 of the University and University College Act 1971 (Act 30) under the Orders of Kolej Universiti Teknikal Kebangsaan Malaysia (Incorporated) 2001. On 1 February 2007, KUTKM was upgraded into a full-fledged technical university and got its present name. At the same time, its emblem was rehashed as the University's emblem.

Campus 
Its eight faculties are supported by two learning centres.

Academics
Faculty, Institute & Academic Centre
 Faculty of Electrical Engineering
 Faculty of Electronics and Computer Engineering
 Faculty of Mechanical Engineering
 Faculty of Manufacturing Engineering
 Faculty of Information and Communication Technology
 Faculty of Technology Management and Technopreneurship
 Faculty Of Electrical And Electronic Engineering Technology
 Faculty Of Mechanical And Manufacturing Engineering Technology
 Centre For Languages and Human Development
 Institute of Technology Management and Entrepreneurship

General Educational Goals 
 To conduct academic and professional programmes based on relevant needs of the industries.   
 To produce graduates with relevant knowledge, technical competency, soft skills, social responsibility and accountability.   
 To cultivate scientific method, critical thinking, creative and innovative problem solving and autonomy in decision making amongst graduates.  
 To foster development and innovation activities in collaboration with industries for the prosperity of the Nation.  
 To equip graduates with leadership and teamwork skills as well as develop communication and lifelong learning skills.  
 To develop technopreneurship and managerial skills amongst graduates.   
 To instill an appreciation of the arts and cultural values and awareness of healthy life styles amongst graduates.

Basic statistics 
Source:

Student demography 
As of 31 July 2019, there are:

 10,930 students, where there are:
 24 Engr.D
 688 PhD(s) - 403 are International Students
 664 Masters - 113 are International Students
 8,383 Bachelor's degree - 161 are International Students
 1,171 Diploma
 26,418 Graduates since 2005

Graduates' general employability 
As of 31 May 2019, the Graduates' General Employability rate is 86%, with the breakdown statistics of:

 65.3% Working
 12.57% Pursuing Further Education
 3% Improving Skillsets
 5.13% Waiting for Placement

Course demography 
As of September 2019, there are 86 programmes offered:

 13 PhD Programmes
 37 Masters Programmes
 29 Degree Programmes
 5 Diploma Programmes
 2 New B.Tech. Programmes to be introduced September 2019

Alumni
 there were 26,242 alumni.

References

External links
 
 UTeM Library
 Vice Chancellor
 Official website - IPTA application
 Education Malaysia
 Malaysian Qualifications Agency
UTeM Journal

Universities and colleges in Malacca
Public universities in Malaysia
Educational institutions established in 2000
Technical universities and colleges in Malaysia
Engineering universities and colleges in Malaysia
Information technology schools in Malaysia
2000 establishments in Malaysia